Ardsollus and Quin  railway station, also spelled Ard Solus was a station on the railway from Limerick to Ennis and served the village of Quin in County Clare, Ireland.

History
Opened by the Limerick and Ennis Railway, at the beginning of the 20th century, the station was run by the Great Southern and Western Railway (GSWR). It was absorbed by the Great Southern and Western Railway Company, and so joined the Great Southern Railways.

During the Irish Civil War, two anti-Treaty IRA members, were executed after being convicted of sabotaging Ard Solus station.

The station was then nationalised, passing on to the Córas Iompair Éireann as a result of the Transport Act 1944 which took effect from 1 January 1945. The passenger service ceased but freight traffic passed on to the Iarnród Éireann in 1986.

References 

Disused railway stations in County Clare
Railway stations opened in 1859
Railway stations closed in 1963
1859 establishments in Ireland
Railway stations in the Republic of Ireland opened in the 19th century